Shining Darkness is a BBC Books original novel written by Mark Michalowski and based on the long-running science fiction television series Doctor Who. It features the Tenth Doctor and Donna Noble. It was published on 4 September 2008, alongside Ghosts of India and The Doctor Trap.

Summary
For Donna Noble, the Andromeda galaxy is a long, long way from home. But, even two and a half million light years from Earth, some things never change . . . A visit to an art gallery turns into a race across space to uncover the secret behind a shadowy organisation. From the desert world of Karris to the interplanetary scrapyard of Junk, the Doctor and Donna discover that appearances can be deceptive, that enemies are lurking around every corner - and that the centuries-long peace between humans and machines may be about to come to an end. Because waiting in the wings to bring chaos to the galaxy is the Cult of Shining Darkness.

Audiobook
An abridged audiobook was released on 12 March 2009, read by Debbie Chazen who played Foon Van Hoff in the episode "Voyage of the Damned".

See also

Whoniverse

References

External links

The Cloister Library - Shining Darkness

2008 British novels
2008 science fiction novels
New Series Adventures
Tenth Doctor novels
Novels by Mark Michalowski
Novels set on fictional planets